James Murphy (1823-1901) was an Irish barrister and judge of the late nineteenth century.

Career 

He was born at Kilfinane,  County Limerick, the fifth son of Jeremiah Murphy. He matriculated at the University of Dublin  in 1842 and took his Bachelor's degree there in 1849. He entered Lincoln's Inn in 1847 and was called to the Bar in 1849. He became Queen's Counsel in 1866.

He was a superb advocate, noted for his "persistence, pathos and humour" in argument. He made his reputation as counsel for the prosecution in the Phoenix Park murders  trials in 1883, and later that year was duly rewarded for the successful outcome of the trials (from the Crown's point of view) by appointment to the High Court. He sat first in the Common Pleas Division before being transferred to the King's Bench Division. He then transferred to the Exchequer Division, before finally returning to the King's Bench.He was appointed to the Privy Council of Ireland in 1890. As a judge he was noted for dignity and efficiency rather than for profound legal learning. His judgments were generally considered to be right, and were rarely overturned on appeal, but very few of them were deemed worth reporting for their legal principles.

It was in private life that Murphy shone most brightly: he was noted for his "warm-hearted hospitality", and his guests were charmed by his lively conversation and erudition. Glencairn House, his home at  Leopardstown, County Dublin, was one of the centres of Dublin social life. Ownership of Glencairn  passed after his death to the notorious Tammany Hall politician Richard Croker ("Boss" Croker), and it is now the official residence of the British Ambassador to Ireland.

Family 

He married Mary Keogh, daughter of Mr Justice William Keogh of the Court of Common Pleas (Ireland) and his wife Kate Rooney, in 1864. Keogh had been a much-hated politician (of "Sadleir and Keogh" infamy, a proverb for betrayal of one's political principles) before his appointment to the Bench, and was an equally unpopular judge, but his son-in-law was always his good friend and champion.

He and Mary had one daughter and five sons, including Harold Lawson Murphy, best remembered as the author of a well-known History of Trinity College Dublin (1951), and Edward Sullivan Murphy, Attorney General for Northern Ireland and later a Lord Justice of Appeal in Northern Ireland.

Sources
Ball, F. Elrington  The Judges in Ireland 1221-1921  London John Murray 1926
Delaney, V.T.H.  Christopher Palles  Dublin Alan Hanna 1960
Thoms Irish Who's Who  Dublin Alexander Thom and Co. 1923

Footnotes

Lawyers from County Limerick
Members of Lincoln's Inn
Alumni of Trinity College Dublin
Members of the Privy Council of Ireland
Judges of the High Court of Justice in Ireland